C1q and tumor necrosis factor related protein 5, also known as C1QTNF5, is a protein which in humans is encoded by the C1QTNF5 gene . The C1QTNF5 gene secreted and membrane-linked to a protein which is strongly expressed in retinal pigment epithelium cells.

Function 

The CTRP5 protein is a member of the C1q / tumor necrosis factor superfamily, which shows diverse functions including cell adhesion and as components of the basement membrane.

Clinical significance 

A mutation in the C1QTNF5 gene causes late-onset retinal degeneration.
More specifically, a single missense mutation (S163R) in the encoded C1QTNF5 protein causes the Late-onset retinal degeneration disease(L-ORD).

Structure 
The structure of C1q and Tumor Necrosis Factor Related Protein 5 (C1QTNF5) which is also called CTRP5 has three essential domains. The first domain is a single peptide which is located in N-terminal,  the second domain is a collage domain and the third domain is a globular complement 1q (gC1q) that exists in the C-terminal domain. The single mutation S163R is found in the gC1q domain which is the main reason for Late-onset retinal degeneration disease(L-ORD). C1QTNF5 is a part of the C1q family. However, there is a unique feature of the structure of C1QTNF5 that it does not own a Ca 2+ binding site as other members of the C1q family.

Crystal structure 
Crystal structure of C1QTNF5 has been taken by  Xiongying and Krzysztof and it has two characteristics. One is that the structure of C1QTNF5 seems not to have a Ca 2+ binding site in order to its stability. Also, it is necessary for the function of the members of the C1q family. Another feature is having an unusual sequence which is (F181, F182, G183, G184, W185, P186) that generate a hydrophobic field.  In this area, S163 and F182 build H bond, However, the mutation S163 will make a disruption to the H bond.

References

Further reading

External links